Spungen is a surname. Notable people with the surname include:

 Deborah Spungen (born 1937), American author
 Nancy Spungen (1958–1978), American murder victim

Surnames of European origin